Benjamin Stuart Targett (born 27 December 1972, in Paddington, New South Wales), is an Australian cricket player, who played for the Tasmanian Tigers from 1997 until 2000. A tall fast bowler, he was known for his consistent line and length bowling but faded from the scene in 1999.

See also
 List of Tasmanian representative cricketers

External links

1972 births
Living people
Australian cricketers
Tasmania cricketers